Sestu is a comune (municipality) in the Metropolitan City of Cagliari in the Italian region Sardinia, located about  north of Cagliari.

References

External links

  Official website
 Infosestu
 Comuni della Sardegna

Cities and towns in Sardinia